Raj Chouhan is a Canadian politician and trade unionist, who was elected to the Legislative Assembly of British Columbia as the MLA for Burnaby-Edmonds in the 2005 provincial election. He is serving as the Speaker of the Legislative Assembly of British Columbia. He previously served as the Deputy Speaker of the Legislative Assembly from 2017 to 2020. While in opposition he served as the critic for Mental Health; Human Rights, Immigration and Multiculturism and Labour. He was re-elected in 2009 and 2013.

Born in the Punjab province of India, Chouhan was the founding president of the Canadian Farmworkers Union and served as a director of the Hospital Employees' Union. He also served as a member of the Labour Relations Board of B.C. and the Arbitration Bureau of B.C.

A founding member of the B.C. Organization to Fight Racism, Chouhan has worked to promote human rights and racial equality. He has served as the Vice President of B.C. Human Rights Defenders since 2003, and has taught courses on Human Rights, the B.C. Labour Code and collective bargaining since 1987.

Electoral record

|-

|-
 
|NDP
|Raj Chouhan
|align="right"|10,337
|align="right"|46.71%
|align="right"|+5.23%
|align="right"|$71,644

|-

References

External links
 Raj Chouhan - New Democrat - Official Opposition
Records of Raj Chouhan are held by Simon Fraser University's Special Collections and Rare Books

British Columbia New Democratic Party MLAs
Indian emigrants to Canada
Living people
Naturalized citizens of Canada
People from Burnaby
Canadian politicians of Indian descent
21st-century Canadian politicians
Year of birth missing (living people)